"Dedication" is a song by American rapper Nipsey Hussle, released on February 13, 2018 as the third single from his debut studio album Victory Lap (2018). The song features American rapper Kendrick Lamar. It was produced by Mike & Keys, Rance and Mars of 1500 or Nothin', Ralo Stylez and Axl Folie.

Background
Nipsey Hussle premiered the song on Zane Lowe's Beats 1 radio show. He said, "I think that record sums up the marathon and the idea of Victory Lap. I think that in three minutes, [I] hit every point that I want to represent musically and just as an artist."

He revealed he told his team to send his record "Keys 2 The City 2" to Kendrick Lamar, but instead they sent "Dedication" to Lamar. Hussle did not know that until Lamar told him about it when they met at the premiere of the film All Eyez on Me. Hussle stated:

I'm like damn I ain't even send that. But he sent it back and when I heard the verse I was really inspired. I felt like he killed it. He talked about something that happened the night of the Pac premiere. If you really listen to his verse, he's talking about me, Snoop Dogg, Top Dawg, and himself. We really had a convo. We had a conversation about just L.A. streets and about how the time might be right right now for us to really try to use our influence to evolve how we exist. From Bloods and Crips, just the tribalism that's going on out there. We were just wondering, we just had an honest convo like what y'all think? Is it time for us to really start that narrative off? And he speaks about that in his verse.

Composition
The song sees the rappers reflecting on the role of dedication, hard work and patience in their successes, over synth production that is reminiscent of West Coast hip hop and gangsta rap. Nipsey Hussle raps about working to bring unity in the streets, while Kendrick Lamar details his rise to success in his career.

Charts

Certifications

References

2018 singles
2018 songs
Nipsey Hussle songs
Kendrick Lamar songs
Songs written by Kendrick Lamar
Songs written by Larrance Dopson
Songs written by Nipsey Hussle
Songs written by Lamar Edwards